The Merchants National Bank or Brooks Building is a commercial building in Saint Paul, Minnesota, United States, built and opened in 1892 as a financial center in St. Paul's Lowertown neighborhood at the corner of Jackson Street and Fifth Street.  The structure, designed by Edward Bassford, uses sandstone in a Richardsonian Romanesque style. The ground floor was occupied by an influential bank, while the upper stories provided law offices.  Several office tenants went on to great state or national prominence, including Cushman Kellogg Davis, Cordenio Severance, Frank B. Kellogg, Pierce Butler, and William D. Mitchell.  For many years, the building was known as the McColl Building. It is listed on the National Register of Historic Places. The four-story structure was carefully rehabilitated and restored by David A. Brooks, and the building now carries his family name.

References

Bank buildings on the National Register of Historic Places in Minnesota
Commercial buildings completed in 1912
National Register of Historic Places in Saint Paul, Minnesota
Richardsonian Romanesque architecture in Minnesota
1912 establishments in Minnesota